The 2020–21 Sydney FC season is the club's 16th season since its establishment in 2004. The club will participate in the A-League for the 16th time. The club will not compete in the 2020 FFA Cup due to the event being cancelled following the COVID-19 pandemic in Australia. The club was scheduled to play in the 2021 AFC Champions League in Uzbekistan from 25 June 2021 to 10 July 2021, but withdrew from the competition on 4 June 2021.

Players

Transfers

Transfers in

From youth squad

Transfers out

Contract extensions

Pre-season and friendlies

Competitions

Overview
{|class="wikitable" style="text-align:left"
|-
!rowspan=2 style="width:140px;"|Competition
!colspan=8|Record
|-
!style="width:30px;"|
!style="width:30px;"|
!style="width:30px;"|
!style="width:30px;"|
!style="width:30px;"|
!style="width:30px;"|
!style="width:30px;"|
!style="width:50px;"|
|-
|A-League

|-
!Total

A-League

League table

Matches

Finals series

AFC Champions League 

Group stage

Matches

Statistics

Squad statistics 
As of 27 June 2021

Goals 

 As of 27 June 2021

Clean sheets 

 As of 27 June 2021

Notes

References

Sydney FC seasons
2020–21 A-League season by team